Evelyne Ruth Hall (née Davidson, later Adams, later Butler; September 10, 1909 – April 20, 1993) was an American hurdler. She won the AAU title outdoors (80 m) in 1930 and indoors (50 m) in 1931, 1933, 1935. At the 1932 Olympics she earned a silver medal in the 80 m, losing in controversial fashion to Mildred Didrikson (1). She placed fourth at the 1936 U.S. Olympic Trials and did not qualify.

After retiring from competitions, Hall worked as a coach and instructor of physical education. She prepared the first American women's athletics team for the 1951 Pan American Games, and for several years headed the U.S. Olympic women's track and field committee. She also worked as a supervisor of the Glendale parks and recreation department.

In an interview on November 11, 1991, at the age of 82, Adams claimed to be the "oldest living American Olympic medalist". Given the source of this claim it may be that she was referring to track and field athletes only.

References

1. Paul Soifer, “A Tale of Two Women: Babe Didrikson, Lillian Copeland, and the Women's Discus at the 1932 Olympic Games,” Southern California Quarterly 78, no. 3 (Fall 1996), pp. 251-252.

External links 

 

1909 births
1993 deaths
American female hurdlers
Athletes (track and field) at the 1932 Summer Olympics
Athletes (track and field) at the 1936 Summer Olympics
Olympic silver medalists for the United States in track and field
Medalists at the 1932 Summer Olympics
20th-century American women
20th-century American people